Shane Drumgold SC (born 1965) is an Australian Barrister, Adjunct Professor of law, and the Australian Capital Territory’s fifth Director of Public Prosecutions. He was appointed on 1 January 2019 by the Attorney General Gordon Ramsay, succeeding Jon White SC.

Early life and education 
Shane Drumgold was born Neville Shane Drumgold in Sydney, New South Wales. Drumgold grew up in the public housing estate of Mount Druitt in Sydney’s outer western suburbs. He attended Lethbridge Park Public School, then Shalvey Public High School. In 1978 his family relocated to Taree, New South Wales. Here he attended Taree High School and then Chatham High School. Drumgold’s father Neville Drumgold suffered severe mental illness and committed suicide in 1987. This had a significant impact on Drumgold’s life. He has referenced the suicide of his father and the death of his younger brother, at three years of age, in his book Palm Tree Justice. He has also spoken about both events in media interviews and public speeches.

Drumgold commenced work for Australia Post in 1984; in 1993 he completed an Australia Post sponsored Certificate in Business Management through Charles Sturt University. In 1995 he was admitted to the Bachelor of Business Economics degree at Charles Sturt University and graduated in 1999.

In 1999, Drumgold applied to the Australian National University and the University of Canberra for admission to the Bachelor of Laws degree. He was rejected by both. Drumgold then enrolled in the Diploma of Justice Studies at the University of Canberra. After successful completion of the first semester he was admitted to the Bachelor of Laws degree at the same University in 2000. He graduated with honours in 2001. In his occasional address to a 2021 graduation class, he noted that following his graduation he was employed as both a prosecutor at the ODPP and tutor at the Australian National University: I cannot explain the surreal experience of standing before a class of University students, teaching them criminal and evidence law, in a degree program they were accepted into the same year I was rejected. This is one of many experiences that has instilled in me the value of keeping one’s eye on the target, regardless of the external narrative. Do not outsource your sense of agency to others, because they do not know your potential like you do and have no interest in re-writing your future.

In 2001 Drumgold was accepted into the Master’s in International Law Degree at the Australian National University. He graduated in 2004.

In 2003 Drumgold was awarded a Churchill Fellowship, studying restorative justice in indigenous communities in the USA, Canada and New Zealand. He published his report in 2004.

Career 
Drumgold left school in 1980 at the age of fifteen, starting as a telegram boy for Australia Post in April 1984 in Penrith, New South Wales. He then worked as a postman in Gloucester, New South Wales from September 1986. He was promoted from postman to postal clerk and then to senior postal clerk. In September 1994 he was promoted to postal manager at the Canberra Parliament House post office, then the Canberra Civic post office. In September 1999 he resigned from Australia Post to pursue full time legal studies.

Between December 1999 and January 2001 Drumgold worked as a part time legal officer at the South Eastern Aboriginal Legal Services in Canberra. in 2001 he published on indigenous custody rates. In April 2002, Drumgold commenced working as a Prosecutor at the Australia Capital Territory Office of the Director of Public Prosecution. He worked part time as a tutor at the Australian National University. He continued this role until his appointment as Director of Public Prosecutions in January 2019.

In 2006 to 2007 Drumgold took leave from the Office of the Director of Public Prosecutions to work as a Public Defender in the Solomon Islands. This was part of the Regional Assistance Mission to the Solomon Islands during which time he defended murder trials:

 Regina v Tonawane, Saeeni and Ors [2006] HCSI-CRC 231 of 2004.
 Regina v Moru [2006] HCSI-CRC 574 of 2005.
 Regina v Yamalo [2006] SCHC 169 of 2005.

He defended matters arguing for a stay or prosecution based on a post-civil war amnesty Regina v Su’u & Ors [2007] HCSI-CRC 333 of 2006. He was lead counsel in a case seeking a High Court declaration of unlawful conduct by the then Australian dominated Solomon Islands Corrective Services in Ross & Ors v Attorney General [2006] SBHC 573 of 2005. Drumgold later published a book discussing many of these cases.

Drumgold has worked as a prosecutor in the Australian Capital Territory for the last twenty years. During this time he prosecuted many of the Territories most serious murders, attempted murders, and conspiracies to murder:

 R v Iacuone SCC 295 of 2009
 R v JR SCC 369 of 2009
 R v Duffy SCC 268 of 2009
 R v Ashcroft SCC 405 of 2010
 R v Elphick SCC 108 of 2011
 R v Sewell SCC 28 of 2011
 R v Yuen SCC 109 of 2011
 R v Costa SCC 240 of 2012
 R v Vojneski SCC 27 of 2013
 R v Al Harazi SCC 207 of 2015
 R v Lee SCC 226 of 2015
 R v Woutersz SCC 73 of 2015
 R v Urlich SCC 204 of 2016
 R v Ophel SCC 344 of 2017
 R v Rappel SCC 204 of 2016
The matter of R v Rappel later became the subject of the 2020 book, The First Time He Hit Her. In 2019 Drumgold was appointed Senior Counsel and was selected by the Australian Bar Association to deliver the Silks address at the High Court of Australia Gala Silks Dinner in February 2020. An article in the New South Wales Bar Association Bar News later noted “[Drumgold] delivered a speech so inspiring and eloquent, that it drew a standing ovation. Among other things, Shane spoke of our responsibilities as role models and our obligation to build a profession that not only embraces but celebrates diversity in all of its forms.”

On 1 January 2019, Drumgold was appointed the Australian Capital Territory’s fifth Director of Public Prosecutions. His time as Director has not been without controversy. An example of this controversy was his decision not to proceed with charges against a man who assisted his wife commit suicide on public interest grounds in the matter of Police v O’Riordan.

Personal life 
In 1983, at eighteen years of age, Drumgold married 16-year-old Julia Kocsis and they had two children. Drumgold and Kocsis divorced in 1996. In 2003 Drumgold married Natasha Zarew, and they had two children.

Drumgold was involved in the sport of boxing; winning a National gold medal at the Australian Masters Games in Adelaide, South Australia in the light welterweight division in 2011 and in 2013 in Geelong, Victoria in the welterweight division. He is a former Director of Referees and Judges for Boxing, Australia Capital Territory and has officiated at national boxing competitions. He retired from the sport after the 2015 National Championships in the Gold Coast, Queensland Australia.

References 

1965 births
Living people
21st-century Australian lawyers
Lawyers from Sydney
University of Canberra alumni
Australian National University alumni
Australian Senior Counsel
Australian prosecutors
Public defenders